Müskürlü (also, Gyrakh-Myuskyurlyu and Myuskyurli) is a village and municipality in the Goychay Rayon of Azerbaijan.  It has a population of 1,040. The municipality consists of the villages of Müskürlü and Qəbələ Müskürlü.

References 

Populated places in Goychay District